This is a list of electoral results for the electoral district of St Kilda in Victorian state elections.

Members for St Kilda
Two members initially, one after the redistribution of 1889.

Election results

Elections in the 1980s

Elections in the 1970s

Elections in the 1960s

Elections in the 1950s

Elections in the 1940s

 Preferences were not distributed.

Elections in the 1930s

Elections in the 1920s

 Preferences were not distributed.

Elections in the 1910s

References

Victoria (Australia) state electoral results by district